Abiba Abuzhakynova (born 4 July 1997) is a Kazakhstani judoka. She won one of the bronze medals in the women's 48kg event at the 2022 World Judo Championships held in Tashkent, Uzbekistan.

She won the silver medal in her event at the 2021 Asian-Pacific Judo Championships held in Bishkek, Kyrgyzstan. She competed in the women's 48 kg event at the 2021 World Judo Championships held in Budapest, Hungary.

References

External links
 

Living people
1997 births
Place of birth missing (living people)
Kazakhstani female judoka
21st-century Kazakhstani women